Macarena Pérez Grasset (born 12 August 1996) is a Chilean Freestyle BMX cyclist.

In 2017 she took second place in the VANS US OPEN on Huntington Beach and that same year she obtained two third places in the FISE WORLD CUP in Montpellier, France and then in Chengdu, China respectively.

In 2019 she took the 2nd place in the Pan American Games and became the first ever Chilean woman to win a world medal in the discipline, taking silver at the UCI Urban Cycling World Championships in Chengdu behind Hannah Roberts of the US. This performance also secured her place at the 2020 Tokyo Olympics. The judges awarded her 86.80 for a ride that included a perfectly landed suicide no-hander and a tailwhip backflip.

References

Living people
1996 births
BMX riders
Chilean female cyclists
Sportspeople from Santiago
Cyclists at the 2019 Pan American Games
Pan American Games medalists in cycling
Pan American Games silver medalists for Chile
Medalists at the 2019 Pan American Games
Cyclists at the 2020 Summer Olympics
Olympic cyclists of Chile
20th-century Chilean women
21st-century Chilean women